Adolph, Landgrave of Hesse-Philippsthal-Barchfeld (29 June 1743 in Ypres – 17 July 1803 in Barchfeld) was a member of the House of Hesse.   He was the ruling Landgrave of Hesse-Philippsthal-Barchfeld from 1777 until his death.

Life 
Adolph was a son of the Landgrave William of Hesse-Philippsthal-Barchfeld (1692-1761) from his marriage with Charlotte Wilhelmine (1704-1766), daughter of Prince Lebrecht of Anhalt-Zeitz-Hoym.  Adolph succeeded his childless brother Frederick as Landgrave of Hesse-Philippsthal-Barchfeld in 1777.

He began his career in the service of his Hesse-Kassel.  He then went in the Dutch service, where he later became a colonel in the 3rd Infantry Regiment of Orange-Nassau.  In 1773, he joined the Prussian army and became chief of the Fusilier Regiment No. 55.  Here he gained the favor of Frederick II and on 16 January 1777 he was appointed  to Major General.  He fought in the Bavarian War of Succession and was attacked by General Wurmser and taken prisoner by the Austrians at Habelschwerdt in 1779.  In 1780 he resigned from the military and retired to Barchfeld.

Marriage and issue 
Landgrave Adolph married on 18 October 1781 in Meiningen with Louise (1752-1805), a daughter of the Duke Anton Ulrich of Sachsen-Meiningen from his marriage with Charlotte Amalie of Hesse-Philippsthal.  With her he had the following children:
 Friedrich Carl Wilhelm Ludwig (1782-1783)
 Charles (1784-1854), Landgrave of Hesse-Philippsthal-Barchfeld
 married firstly in 1816 to Princess Auguste of Hohenlohe-Ingelfingen (1793-1821)
 married secondly in 1823 to Princess Sophie of Bentheim and Steinfurt (1794-1873)
 William (1786-1834)
 married in 1812 to Princess Juliane Sophie of Denmark (1788-1850)
 George (1787-1788)
 Ernest Frederick (1789-1850), never married
 Charlotte (1794-1794)

Ancestry

References 

 Johann Samuel Ersch (ed.): Allgemeine Encyclopädie der Wissenschaften und Künste in alphabetischer ... p. 297
 Eduard Lange, Die soldaten Friedrich's des Grossen, p. 259  Online

1743 births
1803 deaths
18th-century German people
Landgraves of Hesse
House of Hesse
People from Ypres